Torgrim Sollid (born 17 June 1942) is a Norwegian self-taught traditional folk musician, composer and jazz musician (trumpet, flugelhorn, and drums), known for combining folk music with jazz, and for playing in the Jan Garbarek Quartet and Warne Marsh Sextet.

Career 
After growing up in Stor-Elvdal Sollid was drummer in "Veitvet Big Band" and "Jan Garbarek Quartet" (1962–63), prior to training in music therapy in Mo i Rana, where he also played with Guttorm Guttormsen Band. In Molde he played in Erling Aksdal Sextet, and the two then gave out the "mountain jazz" project Østerdalsmusikk (1974) with music by Ole Mørk Sandvik. In the same vein he started the big band Søyr (1976–) in Trondheim, which he has led since to a number of album releases. Sollid played on two albums Sax of a kind (1983) and For the Time Being (1987) by Warne Marsh, with Sidsel Endresen and others in "Blue Moon" he performed at the "Oslo Jazzfestival" in 1995, and participated on the Thomas Winther Andersen album Line Up (1998).

He has been associated with the jazz program at Trondheim Musikkonservatorium and has taught jazz trumpet at Norges Musikkhøgskole, where he began Norway's other jazz education, in addition to the jazz program in Trondheim. With Knut Værnes he led the summer school for Norsk jazzforum.

Awards and honors 
Norwegian champion in amateur jazz 1962 with Jan Garbarek Quartet, awarded third soloist prize

Discography

Solo
1974: Østerdalsmusikk (MAI)

Collaborations
Within Søyr
1977: Søyr (MAI)
1983: Cierny Peter (Odin)
1987: Vectors (Hot Club)
1994: Bussene lengter hjem (Curling Legs)
1997: Med kjøtt og kjærlighet (Curling Legs) with the poetry of Niels Fredrik Dahl and Torgeir Rebolledo Pedersen
2001: Alene hjemme (Curling Legs)

Within Warne Marsh Sextet
1983: Sax of a Kind (Hot Club) with John Pål Inderberg, Terje Bjørklund, Bjørn Kjellemyr, Carl Haakon Waadeland
1987: For the Time Being (Hot Club) with John Pål Inderberg, Erling Aksdal, Bjørn Alterhaug, Ole Jacob Hansen

With Thomas Winther Andersen Line Up
1998: Line Up (NorCD)
2004: Out from a Cool Storage (NorCD)

Crazy Moon
2017: West Side Story (Curling Legs)

References 

1942 births
20th-century drummers
20th-century Norwegian drummers
20th-century trumpeters
21st-century Norwegian drummers
21st-century trumpeters
Living people
Musicians from Eidskog
Norwegian jazz composers
Norwegian jazz drummers
Male drummers
Norwegian jazz trumpeters
Male trumpeters
Male jazz composers
20th-century Norwegian male musicians
21st-century Norwegian male musicians
Søyr members